Max Walker de Laubenfels (1894–1960) was an American spongiologist. He received his undergraduate degree from Oberlin College and his doctorate from Stanford University. 

He was among the most prolific identifiers of new species of Caribbean sponges, describing 60 species from 1932-1954. 

He was a Professor of Zoology at Oregon State College (now Oregon State University) from 1950 to 1958.

Publications 
 , 1954 : The sponges of the west-central Pacific. Studies in zoology, no.7: 320pg.
 , 1929 : The sponges of California. Dept. of Zoology. 634 pg.

See also 
 David John de Laubenfels

References

Spongiologists
20th-century American zoologists
Oregon State University faculty
1894 births
1960 deaths